Dupont Hospital is a 131-bed acute care facility located in Fort Wayne, Indiana. The hospital was opened in 2001 as a joint venture between the Lutheran Health Network and boasts more than 260 area physicians.

The hospital also features the Dupont Resource Center that offers lectures, screenings, counseling and support groups.

Services
Dupont has 13 operating rooms, three endoscopy rooms, two C-section rooms, a special procedures room, a 10-bed ICU, Level III NICU, and 64-slice and 16-slice CT scanners as well as 24/7 emergency services with board-certified physicians. This hospital is rated #83 overall for hospitals in Indiana.

Ambulatory Surgery Center 
The Ambulatory Surgery Center is located in the 2510 Medical Office Building on the hospital Campus. The types of surgeries done at the center are scheduled cases. Emergency surgeries are done at the Main Hospital, rather than the center. Outpatient Surgeries are also done in the main hospital.

Dupont Center for Sleep Health 
Its current location is in the 2514 Medical Office Building on the hospital campus. The Sleep Health Center gives aid to people suffering from issues concerning sleep, and those working at the Center test these patients with a sleep study.

Birthplace 
 12 Labor, Delivery, and Recovery Rooms
 14 NICU Beds (on the 2nd Floor and 3rd Floor)
 24/7 OB Stat 
 24/7 Room Service 
 27 Postpartum Rooms
 20 Bed Nursery 
 Dedicated Maternity entrance and a private elevator that leads to the labor/Delivery Unit

Notes

References  
 Dupont Hospital website
 Dupont's page on the Lutheran Health Network website

Hospital buildings completed in 2001
Hospitals in Indiana
Buildings and structures in Fort Wayne, Indiana
Christian hospitals
Community Health Systems